Gutheim is a surname. Notable people with the surname include:

Allan Gutheim (born 1962), Swedish film composer
Armand Gutheim, Swedish composer
Frederick Gutheim (1908–1993), American urban planner, historian and architect
James Koppel Gutheim (1817–1886), Prussian-born American rabbi
Jeff Gutheim (born 1971), American screenwriter